Sandra Weiner ( Smith; 1921–2014) was a Polish-American street photographer and children's book author.

Weiner was born in Drohiczan, Poland, and emigrated to the United States in 1928. She joined the Photo League in 1942. There, she first studied under photographers Paul Strand, and Dan Weiner whom she would later marry. Following the dissolution of the Photo League in 1951, she was a commercial photographer in the 1950s and later wrote four published children's books.

Collections
Weiner's work is held in the following permanent collections:
San Francisco Museum of Art
International Center of Photography
Metropolitan Museum of Art, New York: 1 print (as of August 2020)
Akron Art Museum

Her personal papers are held in the University of Minnesota libraries.

Children's books
It's Wings That Make Birds Fly (1968) 
Small Hands, Big Hands (1970)  
They Call Me Jack (1973)  
I Want to be a Fisherman (1977)

References

External links

Street photographers
20th-century American photographers
Polish emigrants to the United States
1921 births
2014 deaths
20th-century American women photographers
21st-century American women